The Fred T. Sterling House is an Arts & Crafts style residence in Missoula, Montana, designed by the architect Albert J. Gibson and built in 1912 for a businessman, Frederick Sterling, and his wife Lucina.

References

Houses in Missoula County, Montana
Houses on the National Register of Historic Places in Montana
National Register of Historic Places in Missoula, Montana
Houses completed in 1912
Prairie School architecture in Montana